Villard is a surname of French origin. It may refer to:

Énora Villard (born 1993), French squash player
Fanny Garrison Villard (1844–1948), American suffragist, pacifist, and NAACP co-founder; wife of Henry Villard
Feliks Villard (1908–?), Estonian chess player
Henry Villard (1835–1900), Bavarian German-born American journalist and railroad tycoon; husband of Fanny Villard
Henry Serrano Villard (1900–1996), American foreign service officer, ambassador, and author; grandson of Henry and Fanny Villard
Léonie Villard (1890–1962), French literary critic, academic, and diarist
Nina Villard (1843-1884), French composer, writer and salon hostess
Oswald Garrison Villard (1872–1949), American journalist; son of Henry and Fanny Villard
Oswald Garrison Villard Jr. (1916–2004), American academic and electrical engineer; grandson of Henry and Fanny Villard
Paul Ulrich Villard (1860–1934), French chemist and physicist; discovered gamma rays
Philippe Langenieux-Villard (born 1955), French politician
Sylvia del Villard (1928–1990), Puerto Rican actress, dancer, and choreographer
Tom Villard (1953–1994), American actor
Villard de Honnecourt (13th-cent.), French artist

See also
Vilard (disambiguation)
Villar (surname)
Villari (surname)

French-language surnames